Dietmar Hauer (born 12 March 1968) is an Austrian former cyclist. He competed in two events at the 1988 Summer Olympics.

References

1968 births
Living people
Austrian male cyclists
Olympic cyclists of Austria
Cyclists at the 1988 Summer Olympics
People from Melk District
Sportspeople from Lower Austria
20th-century Austrian people